The Japanese Economic Association (JEA) is the professional body of Japanese economists. The Japanese Economic Association is the largest, with more than 3,000 members, among academic economic associations in Japan. The Association is also one of the oldest, founded in 1934. The Association was reorganized as the Theoretical Economic Association and the Japanese Econometric Association. These two Associations were reunited as the Japan Association of Economics and Econometrics in 1968. The original name of the Association was restored in 1997. Its current president is Hideshi Itoh. It publishes the Japanese Economic Review.

The Association created an official prize, the Nakahara Prize, for the first time in 1995, named after its sponsor Nobuyuki Nakahara. The aim of the prize is honoring and encouraging young (under 45 years) economists to publish internationally-recognised researches.

Founding members
Founding members of JEA included Yasuma Takada, Ichiro Nakayama, Shinzo Koizumi, and Seiichiro Takahashi.

Past and current presidents 
Ichiro Nakayama, 1968-1970
Takuma Yasui, 1970-1971
Fukukane Nikaido, 1978-1979
Nobuo Okishio, 1979-1980
Kenichi Miyazawa, 1981-1982
Takashi Negishi, 1985-1986
Syoujiro Fujino, 1986-1987
Masahiro Tatemoto, 1987-1988
Yoichi Shinkai, 1988-1989
Hirofumi Uzawa, 1989-1990
Shinji Moriguchi, 1990-1991 
Akihiro Amano, 1992-1993
Koichi Hamada, 1994-1995 
Masahiko Aoki, 1995-1996
Keimei Kaizuka, 1996-1997
Michio Hatanaka, 1997-1998
Michihiro Oyama, 1998-1999
Kotaro Suzumura, 1999-2000
Kazuo Nishimura, 2000-2001
Masahiro Okuno-Fujiwara, 2001-2002
Hiroshi Yoshikawa, 2002-2003
Tatsuo Hatta, 2003-2004
Takatoshi Ito, 2004-2005
Toshiaki Tachibanaki, 2005-2006
Kimio Morimune, 2006-2007
Takenori Inoki, 2007-2008
Makoto Yano, 2008-2009
Masahisa Fujita, 2009-2010
Toshihiro Ihori, 2010-2011
Kazuo Ueda, 2011-2012
Yoshio Higuchi, 2012-2013
Yuzo Honda, 2013-2014
Akira Okada, 2014-2015
Kazuo Mino, 2015-2016
Akihiko Matsui, 2016-2017
Michihiro Kandori, 2017-2018
Fumio Hayashi, 2018- 2019
Hidehiko Ichimura, 2019- 2020
Fumio Ohtake, 2020-2021
Masao Ogaki, 2021-May 28,2022
Hideshi Itoh, May 28,2022–present

References

External links 
Homepage

1934 establishments in Japan
Business and finance professional associations
Economics societies
Professional associations based in Japan
Organizations established in 1934